Bánh mật is a Vietnamese dessert. It is made from molasses-sweetened glutinous rice cake, sometimes filled with green bean.

See also

 Bánh mặt trăng moon-shaped cakes are eaten at the feast of Quân Am.
 List of desserts

References

Vietnamese rice dishes
Vietnamese desserts
Rice cakes
Bánh
Stuffed desserts
Legume dishes
Molasses